Murdock Township is one of nine townships in Douglas County, in the U.S. state of Illinois.  As of the 2010 census, its population was 225 and it contained 126 housing units.  It was formed from Camargo and Newman townships on December 7, 1882.

Geography

Unincorporated towns
 Fairland at 
 Murdock at

Cemeteries
The township contains these two cemeteries: Jordan and Murdock.

Major highways
  U.S. Route 36

Airports and landing strips
 Mayhall Airport

Demographics

School districts
 Heritage Community Unit School District 8
 Shiloh Community Unit School District 1
 Villa Grove Community Unit School District 302

Political districts
 State House District 110
 State Senate District 55

References
 
 United States Census Bureau 2009 TIGER/Line Shapefiles
 United States National Atlas

External links
 City-Data.com
 Illinois State Archives
 Township Officials of Illinois

Townships in Douglas County, Illinois
Townships in Illinois